Cheyenne is one of the most populous markets in Wyoming, with a long history of forums and outlets for information. As of 2021, Torrington and Scottsbluff are generally thought to be included in the Cheyenne market.

Print

Newspapers
The Wyoming Tribune Eagle is the city's primary newspaper, published daily. Other newspapers published in the city include:
The Cheyenne Post, weekly, community news
Warren Sentinel, weekly, military news
Wyoming Business Report, monthly, business news

Radio
In its Fall 2013 ranking of radio markets by population, Arbitron ranked Cheyenne 271st in the United States.

The following is a list of radio stations licensed to and/or broadcasting from Cheyenne.

AM

FM

The city also receives radio stations from Laramie, as well as Denver and Fort Collins, Colorado.

Television
The Cheyenne television market includes Goshen and Laramie Counties in southeastern Wyoming as well as Scotts Bluff County, Nebraska.

The following is a list of television stations that broadcast from and/or are licensed to the city.

TV stations from the Denver area are available in Cheyenne, and are usually distributed on local cable and satellite systems alongside local stations.

References

Mass media in Wyoming